= Eurie Hong =

American geneticist

Eurie L Hong
- Education: Stanford University (B.S.); University of Chicago (Ph.D.)
- Children: 1
- Scientific career
- Fields: Genomics
- Workplaces: Stanford University School of Medicine; AncestryDNA; Constellation Genomics Consulting LLC
- Doctoral advisor: Douglas K. Bishop

Eurie Lee Hong is an American geneticist. She is the Vice President of Genomics at AncestryDNA.

== Education ==
Hong earned a bachelor of science in biological sciences from Stanford University. She completed a Ph.D. in molecular genetics and cell biology at University of Chicago. As a graduate student in Douglas K. Bishop's laboratory, Hong worked on the biochemical characterization of the yeast meiotic Dmc1 protein.

== Career and research ==
Hong was a biocuration scientist and head of scientific curation at the Saccharomyces Genome Database at Stanford University School of Medicine. She was later a senior research scientist at the Stanford School of Medicine and project manager of the ENCODE Data Coordination Center at Stanford. In 2015, Hong joined Ancestry.com. As the director of genomics at AncestryDNA, she leads a team of population geneticists, computational biologists, statistical geneticists, and bioinformatic analysts to she develop algorithms and integrate genomic data. She researches the identification of biological insights from genomics and genomic data through computational and bioinformatic solutions. In 2021, she became President and Founder of Constellation Genomics Consulting LLC. She develops data strategies to maximize value & insights for biotech and life science companies, bridging clinical, research, and real world data.

== Personal life ==
Hong is married and has a daughter.
